W9 may refer to:

 A form used by the US federal government for tax purposes
 W9, a postcode district in the W postcode area (England)
 W9 (TV channel), a French television channel
 W9 (nuclear warhead)
 Air Bagan, by IATA code
 London Buses route W9
 , several ships
 The scientific designation for the Niland Geyser